The second generation Chevrolet Volt plug-in hybrid electric compact car produced by General Motors under the Chevrolet brand. It debuted at the 2015 North American International Auto Show to replace the original Volt, on sale since 2010. Retail deliveries as a 2016 model year began in October 2015 in the U.S. and Canada, and it was released in Mexico in December 2015. Availability of the 2016 model was limited to California and the other 10 states that follow California's zero emission vehicle regulations. It went on sale as a 2017 model year in the rest of the U.S. in February 2016.  Volt production ended on February 15, 2019.

The official rating for combined city/highway fuel economy in all-electric mode is 106 miles per gallon gasoline equivalent (MPG-e), up from 98 MPG-e for the 2015 first generation model.

Specifications

The Volt's revised batteries and Voltec powertrain feature a larger 1.5-liter range extender engine tuned for regular gasoline instead of premium required by the first generation. The new engine is rated for 101 horsepower (75 kW), representing approximately 20% more power than the engine used in the previous generation.

As with the first Voltec iteration, the second generation battery pack uses battery cells by LG Chem. Their new chemistry reportedly stores 20% more electrical energy. The second generation battery pack uses fewer cells (192 vs 288), weighs  less and features a capacity increased to 18.4 kWh. The battery pack is projected to use a power controller integral to the motor housing with electric motors weighing  less while using less rare-earth metal.

The official rating for combined city/highway fuel economy in all-electric mode is 106 miles per gallon gasoline equivalent (MPG-e), up from 98 MPG-e for the 2015 first generation model. The combined gasoline-electricity fuel economy rating of the 2016 model year Volt is  equivalent, 82 MPG-e in city driving and 72 MPG-e in highway. Both the all-electric range and fuel economy ratings are the same for the 2017 model year Volt. , and excluding all-electric cars, only the BMW i3 REx has a better combined gasoline-electricity rating (88 MPG-e) than the Volt.

Likewise, only second to the BMW i3 REx, the  all-electric range is the second longest-range achieved by any plug-in hybrid car available for sale. Chevrolet expects that many 2016 Volt owners will run on battery only for 90% of their daily trips, up from 80% for the first generation owners based on OnStar data and other studies. To increase the electrically driven miles, the Volt would need better charging capabilities. The Volt's onboard charger can only handle 3.6 kW though, which is sufficient for overnight charging at the owner's home but falls short of the capabilities of public chargers.  7.2 kW charging system is standard on the 2019 Volt Premier. 7.2 kW charging system upgrade is a factory option on the 2019 Volt LT. The Volt also lacks a DC quick charging connector.

However, many gasoline vehicles, including performance oriented ones, report similar increases to the EPA's estimate when driven in an efficient manner.

Performance

 Top speed:  (as tested)
 Acceleration:

 : 7.1–7.8 s
 Standing 1/4 mile: 15.6 s @ 85.7 mph – 16.1 s at 86 mph

Production and sales

The second generation Volt debuted at the 2015 North American International Auto Show. At the Volt's debut, GM engineers said the second generation Volt was developed using extensive input from first generation owners.

Production of the 2015 model year Volt ended by mid-May 2015, while manufacturing of pre-production units of the second generation began in March 2015. The 2016 Volt starts at  before any available government incentives, plus  for destination; this price is  lower than the 2015 model year Volt. The order books for the second generation Volt opened in California on May 28, 2015. Series production began in August 2015. After California, initial deliveries of the 2016 Volt included Connecticut, Massachusetts, Maryland, Maine, New Hampshire, New Jersey, New York, Oregon, Rhode Island, and Vermont; these are the other states that follow California's zero emission vehicle regulations.

Deliveries to retail customers began in the U.S. and Canada in October 2015 as a 2016 model year. Availability in the American market was limited to California and the other 10 states that follow California's zero emission vehicle rules. GM scheduled the second generation Volt to go on sale as a 2017 model year in the 39 remaining states by early 2016. A total of 1,324 units of the second gen Volt were delivered in the U.S. in October 2015, out of 2,035 units sold that month. The second generation Volt was released for retail customers in Mexico in December 2015. Pricing starts at  638,000 pesos (~).

Manufacturing of the 2017 model year Volt began in February 2016, and the first units arrived at dealerships at the end of February 2016. The 2017 model complies with stricter Tier 3 emissions requirements and is available nationwide. These prices do not include taxes or any applicable government incentives. The Premier model offers two optional Driver Confidence packages with blind-spot warning, rear cross-traffic alert, Collision avoidance systems, lane-keep assist, and intelligent high beams. The 2017 Premier also offers an adaptive cruise control option.

In July 2014, Opel announced that due to the slowdown in sales, the Ampera will be discontinued after the launch of the second generation Volt and that Opel planned to introduce in Europe a successor product in the electric vehicle segment. In April 2015, General Motors confirmed that it will not build the second generation Volt in right-hand-drive configuration. As only 246 units had been sold in Australia by mid-April 2015, the Holden Volt will be discontinued once the remaining stock is sold out.

The Buick Velite 5 was introduced at the 2017 Shanghai Auto Show, a rebadged second generation Chevrolet Volt tailored for the Chinese market. The "Velite 5" was planned to be manufactured in China., but in the event, the car was called the Buick Velite 6 by the time it was actually released into the Chinese market in 2019. This model is to be sold exclusively in China with the same powertrain.

In November 2018, GM announced it would cease Volt production on March 1, 2019, as the Detroit/Hamtramck Assembly plant is being closed. The Detroit-Hamtramck plant also builds the Chevrolet Impala, Buick LaCrosse, and Cadillac CT6. Production of the Volt ended on February 15, 2019.

According to the US 2018 model year ordering guide, new for the 2018 model year (2017 calendar year):

For the US 2019 final model year (2018-2019 calendar year), Chevrolet has added the following new features:

 7.2 kW charging system standard on the 2019 Volt Premier. 7.2 kW charging system upgrade is a factory option on the 2019 Volt LT.
 Option to defer automatic engine-assisted heating system for more all-electric operation. New threshold is minus 13 degrees F / minus 25 degrees C.
 Option to configure Low and Regen on Demand profiles that enable increased regenerative braking capabilities. This improves electric vehicle range and reduces wear and tear on friction brakes.
 New Chevrolet Infotainment 3 system with 8-inch-diagonal color touchscreen. The Infotainment 3 system provides a new energy app as well as capabilities for over the air updates.
 New digital rear-view camera replacing the previous analog system. 
 New driver-switchable Adaptive Cruise Control option.
 Power driver seat standard on 2019 Volt Premier and optional on 2019 Volt LT.

Reception

Car and Driver praised the shape, longer EV range, addition of a regenerative paddle, efficiency and big trunk. The reviewer did not like how the car lost its distinctive styling, that the rear middle seat had little leg room, and, at the full price of the car with all its options, one could buy a BMW.  And for the "lows", Less than comfortable front seats, useless back seats and odd cornering imbalance.  Overall, Car and Driver thought the Volt has been brought to the next level. The second-generation Volt was awarded the "2016 Green Car of the Year" by Green Car Journal at the 2016 LA Auto Show. The Volt became the first model to receive this award more than once.

The second generation Volt scored a "Top Safety Pick+" rating by the Insurance Institute for Highway Safety (IIHS). The plug-in hybrid scored a "Good" rating in all of the IIHS crash worthiness tests. The second-generation Volt was named one of the top ten tech cars in 2016 by IEEE Spectrum.

See also 
Cadillac ELR
Chevrolet Bolt
Chevrolet Spark EV
General Motors EV1 
Government incentives for plug-in electric vehicles
List of modern production plug-in electric vehicles
Plug-in electric vehicle

References

External links

 Official website (archived)

Volt (2nd generation)
Plug-in hybrid vehicles
Front-wheel-drive vehicles
Partial zero-emissions vehicles
Chevrolet Volt (second generation)
Compact cars
Hatchbacks